Kalyanam Kamaneeyam is an Indian Telugu language television series airing on Zee Telugu from Monday to Saturday at 7:30 PM from 31 January 2022. It stars Madhu Sudhan, Meghana Lokesh and Haritha in lead roles. Also singer Mano debuted with this serial in a prominent role. It is also available on digital streaming platform ZEE5.

Plot 
Chaitra and her sister Mahi set out to pursuit of reuniting with their estranged mother, Seetharatnam. In this journey they meet Viraj, the music rock star. They head to Seetharatnam's shelter home. Hamsa tries to snatch Amma Odi. 

Chaitra works at Viraj's house as a physiotherapist. Ananda Varma falls for Chaitra. Anand helps Chaitra at her problems. Chaitra helps Anand's mother for uniting Smiley and Anand.

Cast

Main 

 Meghana Lokesh as Chaitra; Mahi's elder sister; Seetharatnam and Govardhan's daughter
 Madhu Sudhan as Viraj; Rock star; Anand's younger brother; Gomathi's son 
 Haritha as Seetharatnam; Chaitra and Mahi's mother; Govardhan's wife

Recurring 
 Mano as Govardhan; Chaitra and Mahi's father; Seetharatnam's husband
 Amrutha as Mahalakshmi aka Mahi; Chaitra's younger sister; Seetharatnam and Govardhan's daughter
 Tulasi Yerra as Smiley
 Amar Sasanka as Prithvi 
 Ajay Satyanarayana as Anand
 Ragini as Sarojini
 Malakpet Sailaja as Anand and Viraj's grand mother
 Indira Anand as Chaitra and Mahi's grand mother
 Roja Bharathi as Hamsa; Anand and Viraj's Aunt
 Swarna as Gomathi; Anand and Viraj's mother
 Charishma Naidu as Pregnant lady
 Usha Rani as Sarojini's sister in law
 Shravan Kumar as Shravan; Chaitra's ex-fiancé
 Anusha Pratap as Suryakantham; Guest appearance (Reprised her role from Suryakantam)

Title Song

Production 
It is produced by television and film actor KV Sriram, under South Indian Screen production house.

References

External links 

 Kalyanam Kamaneeyam on ZEE5

Zee Telugu original programming
2022 Indian television series debuts
Indian television soap operas
Telugu-language television shows
Indian television series
Serial drama television series